Ceraesignum is a genus of gastropods belonging to the family Vermetidae.

The species of this genus are found in Indian and Pacific Ocean.

Species:

Ceraesignum maximum 
Ceraesignum robinsoncrusoei

References

Vermetidae